Percival Samuel Blight (8 January 1887 – 25 March 1955), who played under the name Sam Bligh, was a New Zealand rugby union and rugby league player. A rugby union hooker, Bligh represented Buller and West Coast at a provincial level, and was a member of the New Zealand national side, the All Blacks, in 1910 whilst playing his provincial rugby for the West Coast and club rugby for the Blackball Rugby Club.

Bligh played all three fixtures for West Coast in 1909, (including the fixture against Buller) was also selected in 1909 from the West Coast for the South Island representative team alongside fellow West Coast representative Walter Sotheran, that beat the North Island side by 19–11 at Athletic Park in Wellington.

Working in the mine at Blackball, near Greymouth, Bligh was likely instrumental in the formation of the Blackball Club in 1910. He was team captain and nominated by the West Coast Rugby Union for selection for the New Zealand to tour Australia that year. Sam Bligh's selection in the 1910 New Zealand team was well publicised in Greymouth newspapers yet, for over 100 years, rugby records had credited Bligh as being affiliated to the Buller Rugby Union at time of selection. This error was only discovered in 2013.

He played five matches for the All Blacks but did not play any internationals. He switched to rugby league in 1915 and played for Blackball. He used a pseudonym when playing rugby, because his family held strong temperance beliefs and disapproved of the game.

References

1887 births
1955 deaths
New Zealand rugby union players
New Zealand rugby league players
New Zealand international rugby union players
West Coast rugby union players
Buller rugby union players
People from Reefton
Blackball players
Rugby league players from West Coast, New Zealand
Rugby union players from West Coast, New Zealand